George Ritchie may refer to:

 George Ritchie (moderator) (1808-1888) Moderator of the General Assembly of the Church of Scotland in 1870
 George Ritchie (footballer, born 1904) (1904–1978), Scottish football wing half (Leicester City and others)
 George Ritchie (footballer, born 1889) (1889–1960), English football forward (Brighton, Reading)
 George Ritchie (organist), American organist
 George Ritchie (politician) (1864–1944), Australian politician
 George Ritchie (rugby union, born 1848) (1848–1896), Scottish rugby player
 George Ritchie (rugby union, born 1909) (1909–1993), Scottish rugby player
 George G. Ritchie (1923–2007), American psychiatrist and writer on near death experiences
 George Stephen Ritchie (1914–2012), British admiral and cartographer